Moinești is a city in Bacău County, Western Moldavia, Romania, with a population of 21,787 . Its name is derived from the Romanian-language word moină, which means "fallow" or "light rain". Moinești once had a large Jewish community; in Jewish contexts the name is often given as Mojnescht or "Monesht". The city administers one village, Găzărie.

History

First mentioned in 1467, the locality was listed among the Moldavian villages on the Bawer map of 1783. A târg was first attested in this location in 1832; it had 188 houses and 588 inhabitants.

In 1921, Moinești was designated a comună urbană ("urban commune"), with its own coat of arms and local administration, but a step short of being considered a city. It became a municipality in 2002. The 2011 census counted 20,855 inhabitants.

Economy
The area around Moinești is rich in natural resources such as petroleum, natural gas, salt and timber. Between the years 1950s and 1980s Moinești experienced a steady economic growth thanks to the large petroleum extracting industry. After 1990, however, following the nationwide industry privatization Moinești's economy changed dramatically, at some points reaching level of unemployment of over 20%.

Dada monument
In 1996, honoring Tristan Tzara, the founder of Dadaism who was born in Moinești, a monument was built on the side of the road that enters the town. It was created from concrete and steel by the German-Romanian sculptor Ingo Glass in the true Dada spirit and it is 25 meters long, 2.6 meters wide and 10 meters high and it weighs 120 tons.

Tourism
Tourist attractions in Moinești include: Băi Park (with healing mineral waters), Pine Tree Park, Ghindaru Hill (where archaeologists discovered artefacts of the pre-Cucuteni culture, over 5,000 years old), the Dada Monument (dedicated to Tristan Tzara), Cetățuia (Dacian fortified city archaeologically certified), and the Jewish Cemetery (where the oldest tombstone with recognisable text dates back to 1692).

People
 Alexandru Barna, footballer
 Robert Căruță, footballer
 Hedi Enghelberg, writer
 Lăcrămioara Filip, gymnast
 Vasile Gherasim, politician
 Alexandru Margină, footballer
 Nestor Rateș, journalist, Head of Romanian Desk of Radio Free Europe 1989, 1994–2002
 Moses Rosen, Chief Rabbi of Romania from 1948 to 1994
 Moshe David Shuv, born Moșe David Iancovici, early Zionist and founder of Rosh Pinna
 Tristan Tzara, writer and founder of Dada

References 

 
Populated places in Bacău County
Localities in Western Moldavia
Jewish communities in Romania
Cities in Romania